Simo Mikko Yrjänä Leinonen (born July 15, 1955 in Tampere, Finland) is a retired Finnish Ice hockey player and currently the chief executive of Finnish elite league SM-liiga team Tappara.  He played 162 games in the National Hockey League for the New York Rangers and Washington Capitals.

Achievements
1979 he became Swedish Elite series champion with Modo Hockey
At age twenty-four, Leinonen competed for the Finnish team in the 1980 Winter Olympics and scored an impressive 3 goals and 3 assists during the tournament.
He won the 1983-84 CHL Championship (Adams Cup) as a member of the Tulsa Oilers team coached by Tom Webster.
Leinonen shares NHL record for most assists in one playoff game with Wayne Gretzky, each with 6.

Career statistics

Regular season and playoffs

International

References

External links

1955 births
Living people
Finnish ice hockey centres
Ice hockey players at the 1980 Winter Olympics
KalPa players
Modo Hockey players
New York Rangers players
Olympic ice hockey players of Finland
Oulun Kärpät players
Ice hockey people from Tampere
Springfield Indians players
Tappara players
Tulsa Oilers (1964–1984) players
Undrafted National Hockey League players
Washington Capitals players